Harrison Sheriff Sohna (born 1 July 2002) is an English professional footballer who plays as a midfielder for Championship club Sunderland. Sohna is a product of the Aston Villa Academy.

Career

Aston Villa 
He made his senior debut as a substitute in a 4–1 FA Cup defeat to Liverpool on 8 January 2021. He went on trial with Sunderland towards the end of the season, and made one Premier League 2 appearance in a 3–2 away win over Norwich City on 16 April. 

Sohna was released by Aston Villa at the end of the 2020–21 season.

Sunderland 
On 1 July 2021, League One club Sunderland announced Sohna as one of several new signings for their academy. Sohna made his senior debut for Sunderland on 10 August 2022, in a 2–0 defeat to Sheffield Wednesday in the EFL Cup.

Career statistics

Personal life 
Harrison's twin brother Myles plays for Aston Villa Under-21s.

References

2002 births
Living people
English footballers
English people of Gambian descent
Association football midfielders
Aston Villa F.C. players
Sunderland A.F.C. players
Black British sportspeople